Movimiento Socialista de los Trabajadores can refer to:

 Workers' Socialist Movement (Argentina)
 Workers' Socialist Movement (Bolivia)
 Workers' Socialist Movement (Puerto Rico)